The House of Candia was a noble family from Savoy (14th-16th). It held a castle at Chambéry-Le-Vieux under the name "Château de Candie".

Members 

François de Candie was Viscount of Geneva (Latin:Vice Dominus Genevarum)  and Captain of the castle on the island of the Rhône in 1377.

References

Sources 
 Comte Amédée de Foras, Armorial et nobiliaire de l'ancien duché de Savoie, vol. 1, Grenoble, Allier Frères, 1863-1966 (archive), p. 299 à 301, « Candie (de) »
 Annuaire de la noblesse de France (1861), on line
 Chateau de Candie 

People from Savoy
History of Geneva
Noble families